Arnold Robert Weber (September 20, 1929 – August 20, 2020) was the president of Northwestern University from 1984–1994. His tenure at Northwestern was marked by stabilizing the university's finances and enhancing the Evanston campus environment.

Biography

Weber was born in a Jewish family in the Bronx, New York, and graduated from the University of Illinois in 1950. At the beginning of his career, Weber was a professor, first at MIT (1957–58), followed by University of Chicago (1958-1973). He then went to Carnegie Mellon University, where he served first as Dean of the Graduate School of Industrial Administration (1973–77), and then as provost and professor until 1980. In 1980, he became President of the University of Colorado, where he served until 1984.

His non-university experience includes serving as president of the Civic Committee of The Commercial Club of Chicago, the leading business and civic organization in the metropolitan area, from 1995–1999.

Prior to and during his tenure at Northwestern, Weber served on the boards of many corporations including Burlington Northern Santa Fe Inc., PepsiCo Inc., Tribune Co., John Deere & Company, Aon Corp. and Inland Steel.

During his career, he served as a member of the faculty at the Graduate School of Business at the University of Chicago and as a presidential appointee and economic adviser in the federal government.

He has been inducted into the National Academy of Arbitrators and the National Academy of Public Administration, is a Laureate of The Lincoln Academy of Illinois and a member of the Academy of Arts and Sciences.

Weber is the author of eight books, as well as numerous monographs and articles on economic policy, industrial and labor relations, and higher education.

References

 http://www.diamondconsultants.com/PublicSite/people/team/?topic=Board+of+Directors&name=Arnold+Weber
 http://www.encyclopedia.chicagohistory.org/pages/910.html

Presidents of Northwestern University
Carnegie Mellon University faculty
Presidents of the University of Colorado System
1929 births
2020 deaths
Writers from the Bronx
University of Illinois alumni
University of Chicago faculty
Jewish American writers